The John Yarbrough Linear Park (originally the Ten Mile Canal Linear Park) is a 6-mile linear park trail located in Fort Myers, Florida. The trail parallels the Ten Mile Canal and the Seminole Gulf Railway, and is owned and operated by Lee County Parks and Recreation. It is part of Lee County's Tour de Parks route along with Lakes Regional Park and other locations.

History

The historic corridor where the John Yarbrough Linear Park runs has existed since the 1920s, when the Ten Mile Canal was dug by the Iona drainage district to control flooding in the area and divert water to Estero Bay.  The Ten Mile Canal corridor would also include two railroad lines.  The Atlantic Coast Line Railroad built tracks on the east side of the canal in 1925, which is today the Seminole Gulf Railway.  From 1926 to 1952, a second railroad line existed on the west side of the canal which was the Seaboard Air Line's All Florida Railway.  Segments of the trail on the west side of the canal run close to former Seaboard right of way. 

The first phase of the linear park trail opened in November 2005 between Six Mile Cypress Parkway and Daniels Parkway.  The first phase is 1.25 miles and includes two shelters with picnic tables.   The second phase opened in October 2006, extending the trail north a mile and a half to Crystal Drive.  The third phase, completed in April 2008, extended it to Colonial Boulevard.

When the trail first opened in 2005, it was known as the Ten Mile Canal Linear Park.  On September 9, 2008, the park was renamed in honor of retiring director John Yarbrough of Lee County Parks and Recreation.

A trailhead with a paved parking lot and restrooms opened at the south end of the trail (at Six Mile Cypress Parkway) opened in early 2022.

Features

The main trail runs from Six Mile Cypress Parkway to Colonial Boulevard in a relatively straight trajectory parallel to the Ten Mile Canal and the Seminole Gulf Railway.  At Six Mile Cypress, trail users can continue south to Alico Road along a bike trail adjacent to Michael G. Rippe Parkway, which was completed in 2012.  The linear park is dog-friendly, and includes picnic tables, benches, and covered shelters for shade.  Roadway crossings include motion-activated flashing signals to warn motorists, although at Daniels Parkway (a major six-lane roadway), trail users are directed west along the road to a signalized intersection.  Due to its proximity to the canal, wildlife including birds, turtles and even alligators can often be seen from the trail.

Parking for the trail is available at the trailhead at Six Mile Cypress Parkway.  There are also unpaved parking lots for the trail on both sides of Daniels Parkway.

Filter Marsh
The park also includes a filter marsh south of Daniels Parkway.  The filter marsh was built along with the first phase of the trail, and is designed to divert and purify water from the Ten Mile Canal.  Purification is achieved as water moves slowly through the marsh, and plants such as white water lilies and bulrush aid the process before the water returns to the canal at the other end.  The marshes and the included plants run right next to the trail and are visible throughout.

Points of interest
Page Field
Seminole Gulf Railway Yard
Ten Mile Canal
Sun Harvest Citrus Factory

Future
Plans are in place to extend the John Yarbrough Linear Park trail north beyond Colonial Boulevard to Hanson Street.  This fourth phase would be built by the City of Fort Myers and would run on the west side of the canal.  It is also anticipated that the city of Fort Myers will extend the North Colonial Linear Park Trail, a similar east–west trail along the North Colonial Waterway, to connect with the northern extension of the John Yarbrough Linear Park.  As of 2018, the City of Fort Myers is conducting a feasibility study of the extension.

The John Yarbrough Linear Park is also planned to be part of the Southwest Coast Regional Connector, an initiative by the Florida Department of Transportation to built a continuous multi-use trail from Tampa to Naples.

Gallery

References

External links

John Yarbrough Linear Park (Official Site)
TrailLink profile for John Yarbrough Linear Park
 John Yarbrough Linear Park Trail at 100 Florida Trails

Hiking trails in Florida
Parks in Lee County, Florida
Rail trails in Florida
Rails with trails
Bike paths in Florida
2005 establishments in Florida